The Ɂakisq̓nuk First Nation, also spelled Akisqnuk First Nation, and formerly known as the Columbia Lake First Nation are a Ktunaxa First Nation in the Kootenays district of the Canadian province of British Columbia. In the British Columbia Treaty Process they are part of the Ktunaxa Nation Council.

Treaty process

, Ɂakisq̓nuk First Nation was in Stage 5 of the BC Treaty Process.

References

East Kootenay
Ktunaxa governments